The women's 1500 metres event at the 1970 British Commonwealth Games was held on 23 July at the Meadowbank Stadium in Edinburgh, Scotland. It was the first time that a race this long was held for women at the Games.

Results

References

Results (p9)

Athletics at the 1970 British Commonwealth Games
1970